The 1986 Full Members' Cup final was a football match which took place at Wembley Stadium on 23 March 1986. It was the final of the inaugural Full Members' Cup, the competition created in the wake of the 1985 ban on English clubs from European competitions following the Heysel disaster. Contested between First Division sides Chelsea and Manchester City, the game produced nine goals, with Chelsea prevailing 5–4. Chelsea had led 5–1 courtesy of David Speedie's hat-trick and a brace by Colin Lee, but Manchester City scored three times in the last five minutes to give them a scare.  Rougvie's own goal, the result of a shot by City's Lillis, denied Lillis the consolation of having scored the fastest hat trick in Wembley history at that point. Both clubs had played First Division games the previous day; Chelsea a 1–0 victory over Southampton, Manchester City a 2–2 draw with local rivals Manchester United. Ten players from each side featured in both games over the weekend.

Match details

References

Chelsea F.C. matches
Manchester City F.C. matches
1986
1985–86 in English football
March 1986 sports events in the United Kingdom
1986 sports events in London